Spoiler or Spoilers may refer to:

Spoiler (media), comment that discloses plot details of a book, play, video game, film, or other narrative content
Spoiler effect (sports), team that has been eliminated from the playoffs and beats a team requiring that win to advance
Spoiler effect, individual unable to win an election or game for oneself but able to determine which player or candidate of two or more others will win 
Spoiler (aeronautics), device to reduce lift in aeronautics
Spoiler (car), device to modify air flow in order to increase fuel efficiency or improve handling in automobiles
Spoiler (security vulnerability), computer security vulnerability
Beam spoiler, piece of material placed into the path of the photon beam in radiation therapy.

Film and TV    
The Spoilers (1914 film), American Western with William Farnum, based on 1906 novel by Rex Beach
The Spoilers (1923 film), remake with Noah Beery, Sr. and Anna Q. Nilsson
The Spoilers (1930 film), remake with Gary Cooper and Betty Compson
The Spoilers (1942 film), remake with Marlene Dietrich, Randolph Scott and John Wayne
The Spoilers (1955 film), remake with Anne Baxter, Jeff Chandler and Rory Calhoun
The Spoiler (TV series), 1972 Australian drama
Spoiler (film), 1998 American science fiction
Spoilers with Kevin Smith, 2012 American "anti-movie review" TV show

Literature
The Spoilers (Beach novel), 1906 American novel by Rex Beach
The Spoilers, 1906 English novel by Edwin Pugh
"The Spoilers", 1965 English short story by Michael Gilbert  
The Spoilers (Bagley novel), 1969 English novel by Desmond Bagley
The Spoiler (novel), 2011 English novel by Annalena McAfee

Music
The Spoiler (album), 1966 release by American jazz saxophonist Stanley Turrentine
The Spoilers (band), American punk rock/new wave musicians formed in 1978
Spoiler (album), 2019 release by Spanish pop singer Aitana

People
Mighty Spoiler (1926–1960), Trinidadian calypsonian
The Spoiler (wrestler) (1940–2006), Canadian masked champion

Characters
The Spoiler, DC Comics superheroine introduced in 1992, subsequently referenced as Stephanie Brown

See also
Spoiler Alert (disambiguation)